Anthony Dalton Roche AO MBE (born 17 May 1945) is an Australian former professional tennis player. 

A native of Tarcutta, Roche played junior tennis in the New South Wales regional city of Wagga Wagga. He won one Grand Slam singles title, the 1966 French Open at Roland Garros, and 15 Grand Slam doubles titles. In 1968, Roche won the WCT/NTL combined professional championships in men's singles by winning the final event of the season at Madison Square Garden. He was ranked World No. 2 by Lance Tingay of The Daily Telegraph in 1969. He won the U.S. Pro Championships in 1970 at Longwood in Boston. Roche won the New South Wales Open twice, in 1969 and 1976. He won a key Davis Cup singles match in 1977. He also coached multi-Grand Slam winning world No. 1s Ivan Lendl, Patrick Rafter, Roger Federer and Lleyton Hewitt as well as former World No. 4 Jelena Dokic.

Playing career

Roche started to play tennis at school when he was nine. His father, who worked as a butcher, and his mother were both recreational tennis players and encouraged his interest. Roche grew up playing in Australia under the tutelage of Harry Hopman, who also coached other Australian tennis players such as Rod Laver and Ken Rosewall.

Roche had a successful singles and double career. He won one singles Grand Slam tournament, the 1966 French Open at Roland Garros, defeating István Gulyás in the final. He was five times the runner-up at Grand Slam tournaments: the French Championships in 1965 and 1967, losing to Fred Stolle and Roy Emerson respectively, Wimbledon in 1968, losing to Rod Laver, and the US Open in 1969 and 1970, losing to Rod Laver and Ken Rosewall. With compatriot John Newcombe, he won 12 Grand Slam men's doubles tournaments.

In January 1968, Roche turned professional, signing with World Championship Tennis, joining other pros like John Newcombe, Cliff Drysdale, Nikola Pilić and Roger Taylor to form the "Handsome Eight". Roche was guaranteed $125,000 annually, an amount equivalent to the annual salary of Willie Mays, the top paid baseball player.

Roche was the leading money winner on the WCT tour in 1968. In the 1968 final for the WCT/NTL professional tours at Madison Square Garden, Roche defeated Rod Laver in the semifinal and Pancho Gonzales in the final to become the combined professional champion for 1968. 

Roche held a personal head-to-head edge over Laver during the latter's Grand Slam season of 1969, 5 to 4. Roche and Laver played a classic match against each other in the 1969 Australian Open at Brisbane. Roche also contested the final match of Laver's Grand Slam run that year, the 1969 U.S. Open final.

Roche won the U.S. Pro Championships at Longwood, Boston in 1970, defeating Laver in a hard fought five set final.
Roche won two New South Wales Open titles, in 1969 over Rod Laver in a close four-set final, and in 1976 against Dick Stockton in the final.

Perhaps one of his greatest achievements came in 1977, playing singles in the finals of the Davis Cup tournament versus Italy, nearly 10 years since he had last played for Australia. In the tie, Roche upset top Italian Adriano Panatta, 6–3, 6–4, 6–4 to lead Australia to a 3–1 victory, winning the Davis Cup. 

Shoulder and elbow injuries cut short his career after having finished in the top 10 for six consecutive years.

Coaching career
After completing his playing career, Roche has developed a highly successful career as a tennis coach. He was the player-coach of the Denver Racquets who won the first World Team Tennis in competition 1974, and he was named WTT Coach of the Year. Ivan Lendl hired Roche in 1985 as a full-time coach for Roche's advice on volleying. Lendl dreamed of winning Wimbledon, and because Roche had been a fine grass court player, he sought his tutelage. Roche also coached former world no. 1 Patrick Rafter from 1997 to the end of his career in 2002. Roche coached world no. 1 Roger Federer from 2005 to 12 May 2007. It is reputed this was on a "handshake agreement" with no contract; Roche was paid by the week. Federer hired Roche for the opposite reason that Lendl hired him: to work on his clay-court game (as Roche had won the 1966 French Championships). He also coached two-time Grand Slam singles titlist Lleyton Hewitt, who was aiming to get his career back on track after a number of unsuccessful years on the ATP Tour.

Honours
Roche was made a Member of the Order of the British Empire (MBE) in 1981 and an Officer of the Order of Australia (AO) in 2001. He entered the International Tennis Hall of Fame alongside doubles partner and close friend John Newcombe in 1986. In 1990 he was inducted into the Sport Australia Hall of Fame. He received an Australian Sports Medal in 2000 and a Centenary Medal in 2001.

Grand Slam finals

Singles: 6 (1 title, 5 runners-up)

Doubles: 15 (13 titles, 2 runners-up)

Mixed doubles: 5 (2 titles, 3 runners-up)

Grand Slam Singles performance timeline

Open-Era finals

Singles

Doubles

References

External links
 
 
 
 
 

Australian Championships (tennis) champions
Australian Championships (tennis) junior champions
Australian male tennis players
Australian Open (tennis) champions
Australian tennis coaches
French Championships (tennis) champions
French Open champions
Sportspeople from Wagga Wagga
Australian Members of the Order of the British Empire
Officers of the Order of Australia
International Tennis Hall of Fame inductees
Sport Australia Hall of Fame inductees
Recipients of the Australian Sports Medal
Recipients of the Centenary Medal
Tennis people from New South Wales
United States National champions (tennis)
Wimbledon champions
Wimbledon champions (pre-Open Era)
1945 births
Living people
Grand Slam (tennis) champions in men's singles
Grand Slam (tennis) champions in mixed doubles
Grand Slam (tennis) champions in men's doubles
Professional tennis players before the Open Era
Grand Slam (tennis) champions in boys' singles